The Benty Grange helmet is an Anglo-Saxon boar-crested helmet from the 7th century AD. It was excavated by Thomas Bateman in 1848 from a tumulus at the Benty Grange farm in Monyash in western Derbyshire. The grave had probably been looted by the time of Bateman's excavation, but still contained other high-status objects suggestive of a richly furnished burial, such as the fragmentary remains of a hanging bowl. The helmet is displayed at Sheffield's Weston Park Museum, which purchased it from Bateman's estate in 1893.

The helmet was constructed by covering the outside of an iron framework with plates of horn and the inside with cloth or leather; the organic material has since decayed. It would have provided some protection against weapons, but was also ornate and may have been intended for ceremonial use. It was the first Anglo-Saxon helmet to be discovered, with five others found since: Sutton Hoo (1939), Coppergate (1982), Wollaston (1997), Shorwell (2004) and Staffordshire (2009). The helmet features a unique combination of structural and technical attributes, but contemporaneous parallels exist for its individual characteristics. It is classified as one of the "crested helmets" used in Northern Europe from the 6th to 11th centuries AD.

The most striking feature of the helmet is the boar at its apex; this pagan symbol faces towards a Christian cross on the nasal in a display of syncretism. This is representative of 7th-century England when Christian missionaries were slowly converting Anglo-Saxons away from traditional Germanic paganism. The helmet seems to exhibit a stronger preference toward paganism, with a large boar and a small cross. The cross may have been added for talismanic effect, the help of any god being welcome on the battlefield. The boar atop the crest was likewise associated with protection and suggests a time when boar-crested helmets may have been common, as do the helmet from Wollaston and the Guilden Morden boar. The contemporary epic Beowulf mentions such helmets five times and speaks of the strength of men "when the hefted sword, its hammered edge and gleaming blade slathered in blood, razes the sturdy boar-ridge off a helmet".

Description

The Benty Grange helmet was made by covering an iron frame with horn. The framework, which now exists in sixteen corroded fragments, originally consisted of seven iron strips, each between 1 and 2 millimetres thick. Two strips of the same width ran from front to back, and from side to side. The lateral band ran from ear to ear; both ends are broken off slightly below the brow band, but it would have extended further as part of a cheek or ear protection. It was affixed to the outside of the dexter (wearer's right) side of the brow band, the inside of the sinister (wearer's left) side, and the outside of the nose-to-nape band. The four quadrants created by this configuration were each subdivided by a narrower subsidiary strip of iron, only one of which now survives. Each subsidiary strip was attached to the outside of the brow band  from the centre of the lateral band. The inside of the helmet was most likely originally lined with leather or cloth, since decayed.

Eight plates of horn, probably softened and bent and suggested to be from cattle, were cut to fit the eight spaces created by the iron frame. No horn now survives, but mineralized traces on the iron strips preserve the grain pattern. The plates were fitted over the iron, thereby hiding it, and abutted at the centre of each strip. The joins were hidden by further pieces of horn that were cut to the width of the iron strips and placed on top. Traces of horn on the rear extension of the nose-to-nape band, and on the rear brow band, suggest that the material was also used for a neck guard. These suggest that pieces of horn, extending  from the centre of the brow band to the bottom of the rear nose-to-nape band, would have met each extension of the lateral band at a 5° angle, reaching them  from the centre of the brow band.

In addition to the aesthetic elements incorporated into the basic construction of the helmet, two features provide added decoration: a cross on the nasal and a boar on the crest. A silver strip was added underneath, elongating what was originally an equal-armed cross. It was placed atop a layer of horn and attached to the helmet with two rivets, one at the intersection of the two arms and one at the bottom. Around the cross in a zigzag pattern are twenty-nine silver studs, out of a suggested original forty, that were probably tapped into small holes drilled or bored into the horn.

The most distinctive feature of the Benty Grange helmet is its boar, affixed to the apex of the helmet. The space between the two halves was filled in with a substance, likely horn or metal, which has now disintegrated; it perhaps projected upwards, forming the mane or spine of the boar, or, as has been interpreted on the replica, created a recess into which a mane of actual boar bristles could fit. On either side of the bronze core was affixed a plate of iron, forming the visible exterior of the boar. Four pear-shaped plates of gilded silver—cut down and filed from Roman silver, as evidenced by a classical leaf design on the reverse of the front left plate, and file marks on the obverse—acted as hips, through which passed two silver rivets, one atop the other, per end. These rivets held together the five layers of the boar, and were welded to the plates. The studs, likely flush with the surface of the body, were filed down and gilded, and may have been intended to represent golden bristles. Individual pieces of gilded bronze seem to have formed the tail, tusks, muzzle, jawline, and ears of the boar, but few traces of them now remain. Two sets of iron legs—probably solid originally, but rendered hollow by corrosion—attached the body to an elliptical bronze plate; both sets depict front legs, bent forwards without account for the anatomical differences between a boar's fore and hind limbs. Four holes indicate attachment points for the legs and another three connected the plate to the frame of the helmet, in addition to a large rivet hole slightly behind the centre. The plate was probably affixed directly to the frame, the legs passing through holes in the horn.

Function
The Benty Grange helmet would have both offered some protection if worn in battle, and indicated its wearer's status. As the Weston Park replica shows, it would have originally been an impressive object, and may have been intended for ceremonial use. Experiments using a mockup of the replica also showed that the helmet would have resisted blows with an axe, which damaged the horn without entirely breaking it. Arrows and spears pierced the horn, but they also pierced modern fibreglass and safety helmets.

Helmets were rare in Anglo-Saxon England, and the Benty Grange helmet, both by its richness and its scarcity, signified the high status of its owner. Such protection certainly seems to have been among the armour of the affluent. In the contemporary epic Beowulf, a poem about kings and nobles, they are relatively common, while the helmeted Vendel and Valsgärde graves from the same period in Sweden, thought to be the burials of wealthy non-royals, suggest that helmets were not solely for the use of the élite. Yet thousands of furnished Anglo-Saxon graves have been excavated since the start of the 19th century and helmets remain rare; this may partly reflect poor rates of artefact survival or even recognition, but their extreme scarcity indicates that they were never deposited in great numbers.

Discovery

Location 

The helmet was discovered in a barrow on the Benty Grange farm in Derbyshire, in what is now the Peak District National Park. Thomas Bateman, an archaeologist and antiquarian who led the excavation, described Benty Grange as "a high and bleak situation"; its barrow, which still survives, is prominently located by a major Roman road, now the A515, possibly to display the burial to passing travellers. It may have also been designed to share the skyline with two other nearby monuments, Arbor Low stone circle and Gib Hill barrow.

The seventh-century Peak District was a small buffer state between Mercia and Northumbria, occupied, according to the Tribal Hidage, by the Anglo-Saxon Pecsæte. The area came under the fold of the Mercian kingdom around the eighth century; the Benty Grange and other rich barrows suggest that the Pecsæte may have had their own dynasty beforehand, but there is no written evidence for this.

Excavation 
Bateman excavated the barrow on 3 May 1848. Although he did not mention it in his account, he was likely not the first person to dig up the grave. Being so large it may alternatively or additionally have contained two burials, only one of which was discovered by Bateman.

Bateman suggested a body once lay at its centre, flat against the original surface of the soil; what he described as the one remnant, strands of hair, is now thought to be from a cloak of fur, cowhide or something similar. The recovered objects were found in two clusters. In the former area Bateman described "a curious assemblage of ornaments", which were difficult to remove successfully from the hardened earth. Its rim was edged with silver, while its surface was "decorated by four wheel-shaped ornaments and two crosses of thin silver, affixed by pins of the same metal, clenched inside". Also found were the remnants of three hanging bowl escutcheons, as well as "a knot of very fine wire", and some "thin bone variously ornamented with lozenges &c." attached to silk, but that soon decayed when exposed to air.

Approximately  to the west of the other objects was found a jumbled mass of ironwork. Separated, this mass included a collection of chainwork, a six-pronged piece of iron resembling a hayfork, and the helmet. As Bateman described it:

Bateman closed his 1849 account of the excavation by noting the "particularly corrosive nature of the soil", which by 1861 he said "has generally been the case in tumuli in Derbyshire". He suggested that this was the result of "a mixing or tempering with some corrosive liquid; the result of which is the presence of thin ochrey veins in the earth, and the decomposition of nearly the whole of the human remains." Bateman's friend Llewellynn Jewitt, an artist and antiquarian who frequently accompanied Bateman on excavations, painted four watercolours of the finds, parts of which were included in Bateman's 1849 account. This was more than Jewitt produced for any other of their excavations, a mark of the importance that they assigned to the Benty Grange barrow.

The helmet entered the extensive collection of Bateman, where it attracted interest. On 27 October 1848 he related his discoveries, including the helmet, to the British Archæological Association, and in 1855 it was catalogued along with other objects from the Benty Grange barrow. In 1861 Bateman died at 39, and in 1876 his son, Thomas W. Bateman, loaned the objects to Sheffield. They were displayed at the Weston Park Museum through 1893, at which time the museum purchased objects, including the helmet, from the family; other pieces were dispersed elsewhere. As of 2021, the helmet remains in the collection of the museum. From 8 November 1991 to 8 March 1992 it joined the Coppergate helmet at the British Museum for The Making of England: Anglo-Saxon Art and Culture, AD 600–900.

The Benty Grange barrow was designated a scheduled monument on 23 October 1970. The list entry notes that "[a]lthough the centre of Benty Grange [barrow] has been partially disturbed by excavation, the monument is otherwise undisturbed and retains significant archaeological remains." It goes on to note that further excavation would yield new information. The nearby farm was renovated between 2012 and 2014; as of 2021 it is rented out as a holiday cottage.

Conservation
In 1948, the helmet was brought to the British Museum to undergo cleaning and study. Permission to carry out the work had been requested the previous year, when Rupert Bruce-Mitford, recently returned from World War II service in the Royal Signals to an assistant keepership at the museum, spent time in Sheffield examining the Benty Grange grave goods. A 1940 letter from T. D. Kendrick to Bruce-Mitford's army camp had assigned him his position, and responsibility for the Sutton Hoo discoveries—"Brace yourself for the task", the letter concluded. Upon his return, he therefore took to studying the comparison material; his work in 1947 included the excavation of the Valsgärde 11 boat-grave in Sweden alongside Sune Lindqvist, and the trip to Sheffield, intended to shed light on the Sutton Hoo helmet through comparison with the only other Anglo-Saxon helmet then known. Permission was obtained from the curator and trustees of the Weston Park Museum for the proposed work, and, by February 1948—when, shortly before the centennial of its excavation, Bruce-Mitford exhibited it to the Society of Antiquaries of London—the Benty Grange helmet was brought to London.

Work at the British Museum was overseen by keeper of the research laboratory Harold Plenderleith, who in some cases, particularly with the boar, did the work himself; additional input was provided by Bruce-Mitford, the technical attaché and authority on ancient metalwork Herbert Maryon, and the archaeologist and art historian Françoise Henry. In the hundred years following its exposure to the air the helmet had continued to corrode, and certain parts had become indiscernible. The boar was unrecognizable, and the silver rivets and cross were almost completely obscured. A strong needle was used to pick off the encrustation, revealing the underlying features. During this process, the boar, hitherto thought solid, snapped in two. Bruce-Mitford termed this occurrence "fortunate", for it revealed the boar's inner structure. Frederic Charles Fraser examined the remnants of horn at the Natural History Museum, and conducted experiments softening and shaping modern horn.

Typology

The Benty Grange helmet is dated to the first half of the 7th century AD, on the basis of its technical construction and decorative style. It is one of six Anglo-Saxon helmets, joined by the subsequent discoveries from Sutton Hoo, York, Wollaston, Shorwell, and Staffordshire. These are all, other than the Frankish Shorwell helmet, examples of the "crested helmets" known in Northern Europe in the 6th through 11th centuries AD. Such helmets are characterized by prominent crests and rounded caps, traits shared by the Benty Grange example, and other than a Viking Age fragment found in Kiev, uniformly originate from England or Scandinavia; contemporary continental helmets were primarily spangenhelm or lamellenhelm.

The ultimate form of the helmet is unparalleled among surviving Anglo-Saxon and crested helmets, although individual characteristics are shared. While other Anglo-Saxon helmets were typically formed with wide perpendicular bands and four infill plates, their Swedish counterparts from Vendel and Valsgärde display similar use of thin iron frameworks. The complicated construction of the Benty Grange boar, which combines garnet, filigree, gold, silver, iron, and bronze, is unique across ornamental Anglo-Saxon objects, but the general boar-crest is paralleled by the Wollaston and Guilden Morden boars. One other helmet exhibits the use of horn, but it is the spangenhelm-type helmet of a high-status child, discovered in Cologne.

Iconography

The helmet was made during the nascent days of Christianity in Anglo-Saxon England, and exhibits both Christian and pagan motifs. The boar invoked a pagan tradition and the cross a Christian belief. Roman Britain had been officially converted to Christianity in the fourth century, although Celtic paganism remained strong. In the fifth century Ireland was converted by British missionaries and in 563 Irish missionaries based in the monastery of Iona off the western coast of Scotland embarked on the conversion of the Picts. Christianity almost disappeared in southern Britain after its conquest by the pagan Anglo-Saxons in the fifth and sixth centuries, apart from the surviving Celtic areas of southwest England and Wales. In 597 Pope Gregory the Great sent the Gregorian mission to Kent to embark on the conversion of the Anglo-Saxons. It rapidly converted kingdoms as far north as Northumbria, but initial success was often followed by a period of apostasy and in several cases the final conversion was carried out by Irish missionaries from Iona. It is not known whether the Pecsæte were converted by adherents of the Roman or Irish Celtic tradition.

The Benty Grange helmet was made during this time of change, as evidenced by its syncretic display. It emphasises the pagan element, a large boar dominating a small cross. The cross may not necessarily be an indication of Christian belief; it may have instead been chosen for its amuletic effect. Whatever the politics behind religious conversion, the battlefield was not a place to discriminate against gods.

Notes

References

Bibliography
  
  
  
  
  
  
  
  
  
 
Old English quotations above use the Klaeber text, published as  
  
  
  
 
  
  
 
  
 
 
  
 
 Includes prefatory essays My Japanese Background and Forty Years with Sutton Hoo by Bruce-Mitford.
  
  
 

 
  
 
  
 Images on plate XIV
 
 
  
  
  
 
  
  
  
  
  
  
  
  
 
 
  
  
  
  
  
 
  
  
  
  
  
  
  
  
  
  
 
  
 
  

7th-century artifacts
1848 archaeological discoveries
Anglo-Saxon archaeology
Beowulf
History of Derbyshire
Individual helmets
Medieval helmets
Pigs in art